A by-election was held for the Australian House of Representatives seat of Corangamite on 14 December 1918. This was triggered by the death of Nationalist MP Chester Manifold.

In October, the Labor Party had won a by-election for the safe conservative seat of Swan when the entry of the Farmers' and Settlers' Association had split the conservative vote. The Nationalists quickly introduced preferential voting, which was first practiced at the Corangamite by-election. Although the Labor candidate, future Prime Minister James Scullin, came first on the primary vote, Nationalist preferences elected William Gibson of the Victorian Farmers' Union, who thus became the first "Country" member of the Australian Parliament.

Results

References

1918 elections in Australia
Victorian federal by-elections
1910s in Victoria (Australia)